Whigham may refer to:

Places:
 Whigham, Georgia, US, a city

People:
 H. J. Whigham, Scottish writer and golfer
 Jiggs Whigham, American jazz trombonists
 Larry Whigham, American football player
 Peter Whigham, English poet
 Robert Whigham, British Army general
 Shea Whigham, American actor
 Sybil Whigham, Scottish golfer
 Willie Whigham, Scottish footballer

Other:
 Whigham GW-1, glider
 Whigham GW-2, glider
 Whigham GW-3, glider
 Whigham GW-4, glider
 Whigham GW-5, glider
 Whigham GW-6, glider
 Whigham GW-7, glider

Disambiguation pages with surname-holder lists